Murmur, in comics, may refer to:

Murmur (DC Comics), a DC Comics supervillain
Murmur (Marvel Comics), a Marvel Comics superhero

See also
Murmur (disambiguation)